Euphorbia peplis, the purple spurge, is a species of Euphorbia, native to southern and western Europe, northern Africa, and southwestern Asia, where it typically grows on coastal sand and shingle.

At the northern edge of its range in England, it has always been rare, and is now extinct.

References

External links
 
 

peplis
Flora of Africa
Flora of Asia
Flora of Europe
Flora of Lebanon
Halophytes
Plants described in 1753
Taxa named by Carl Linnaeus